Novak Djokovic defeated the defending champion Rafael Nadal in a rematch of the previous year's final, 6–2, 6–4, 6–7(3–7), 6–1 to win the men's singles tennis title at the 2011 US Open. It was his first US Open title, his third major of the year, and his fourth major title overall. Djokovic  saved match points en route to the title, saving two against Roger Federer in the semifinals. This was the second consecutive US Open where Djokovic saved two match points against Federer to reach the final, and the fifth consecutive US Open where Djokovic and Federer played each other. With the loss, Federer failed to win a major in a calendar year for the first time since 2002.

Andy Roddick and John Isner, who both lost in the quarterfinals, became the last American men to reach the quarterfinals of a Grand Slam tournament until Sam Querrey reached the quarterfinals at the 2016 Wimbledon Championships, a span of 22 majors.

This was the last major for two-time quarterfinalist and former world No. 5 Fernando González, and the last US Open appearances for 2003 finalist and former world No. 1 Juan Carlos Ferrero, 2003 semifinalist and former world No. 3 David Nalbandian, and former world No. 3 Ivan Ljubičić.

Seeds

Qualifying

Main draw

Finals

Top half

Section 1

Section 2

Section 3

Section 4

Bottom half

Section 5

Section 6

Section 7

Section 8

References

External links
 Association of Tennis Professionals (ATP) – 2011 US Open Men's Singles draw
2011 US Open – Men's draws and results at the International Tennis Federation

2011 US Open (tennis)
US Open (tennis) by year – Men's singles